D.B. Cooper is a media epithet for an unidentified man who hijacked Northwest Orient Airlines Flight 305, a Boeing 727 aircraft operated by Northwest Orient Airlines, in United States airspace on November 24, 1971. During the flight from Portland, Oregon, to Seattle, Washington, the hijacker told a flight attendant he was armed with a bomb, demanded $200,000 in ransom, and requested four parachutes upon landing in Seattle. After releasing the passengers in Seattle, the hijacker instructed the flight crew to refuel the aircraft and begin a second flight to Mexico City, with a refueling stop in Reno, Nevada. About 30 minutes after taking off from Seattle, the hijacker opened the aircraft's aft door, deployed the staircase, and parachuted into the night over southwestern Washington. The hijacker has never been identified or found. 

In 1980, a small portion of the ransom money was found along the banks of the Columbia River. The discovery of the money renewed public interest in the mystery, but yielded no additional information about the hijacker's identity or fate, and the remaining money was never recovered. The hijacker identified himself as Dan Cooper, but because of a reporter's mistake, he became known as "D. B. Cooper".

For 45 years after the hijacking, the Federal Bureau of Investigation (FBI) maintained an active investigation and built an extensive case file, but ultimately did not reach any definitive conclusions. The crime remains the only unsolved case of air piracy in the history of commercial aviation. The FBI speculates Cooper did not survive his jump, for several reasons: The inclement weather on the night of the hijacking, Cooper's lack of proper skydiving equipment, his drop zone was a heavily wooded area, Cooper's apparent lack of detailed knowledge of his landing area, and the disappearance of the remaining ransom money, suggesting it was never spent. In July 2016, the FBI officially suspended active investigation of the NORJAK (Northwest hijacking) case, although reporters, enthusiasts, professional investigators, and amateur sleuths continue to pursue numerous theories for Cooper's identity, success, and fate.

Cooper's hijacking—and several imitators in the following year—led to immediate and major changes for commercial aviation and stricter airport security measures. Metal detectors were installed, baggage inspection became mandatory, and passengers who paid cash for tickets on the day of departure were selected for additional scrutiny. Boeing 727s were retrofitted with eponymous "Cooper vanes", specifically designed to prevent the aft staircase from being lowered in-flight. By 1973, aircraft hijacking incidents had decreased as the new security measures successfully dissuaded would-be hijackers whose only motive was money.

Hijacking 

On Thanksgiving Eve, November 24, 1971, a man carrying a black attaché case approached the flight counter of Northwest Orient Airlines at Portland International Airport. On his ticket, the man listed his name as "Dan Cooper". Eyewitnesses described Cooper as a white male in his mid-40s, with dark hair and brown eyes, wearing a black or brown business suit, a white shirt and a thin, black tie, a black raincoat, and brown shoes. Cooper took seat 18-E in the last row, and ordered a drink: bourbon and 7-Up.

With a crew of six and 37 passengers aboard, Flight 305 left Portland on-schedule at 2:50 pm PST. Shortly after takeoff, Cooper handed a note to flight attendant Florence Schaffner, sitting in the jump seat directly behind Cooper. Assuming the note was a lonely businessman's phone number, Schaffner dropped the note unopened into her purse. Cooper then leaned toward her and whispered, "Miss, you'd better look at that note. I have a bomb."

Schaffner opened the note. In neat, all-capital letters printed with a felt-tip pen, Cooper had written, "Miss—I have a bomb in my briefcase and want you to sit by me." Schaffner returned the note to Cooper, sat down as Cooper requested, and quietly asked to see the bomb. Cooper opened his briefcase, and Schaffner saw two rows of four red cylinders she assumed was dynamite. Attached to the cylinders were a wire and a large, cylindrical battery.

Cooper closed the briefcase, and told Schaffner his demands. Schaffner wrote a note with Cooper's demands, carried the note to the cockpit, and informed the flight crew of the situation. Captain Scott directed Schaffner to remain in the cockpit for the remainder of the flight and take notes of events as they unfolded. Scott then contacted Northwest flight operations in Minnesota, and relayed the hijacker's demands: "[Cooper] requests $200,000 in a knapsack by 5:00 pm. He wants two front parachutes, two back parachutes. He wants the money in negotiable American currency."
With Schaffner in the cockpit, flight attendant Tina Mucklow sat next to Cooper to act as a liaison between Cooper and the flight crew in the cockpit. Cooper then made additional demands - upon landing in Seattle, the fuel trucks must meet the plane and all passengers must remain seated while Mucklow brought the money aboard. After he had the money, said Cooper, he would release the passengers. The last items brought aboard would be the four parachutes.

Captain William A. Scott informed Seattle–Tacoma Airport air traffic control (ATC) of the situation, and Sea-Tac ATC contacted local police and the FBI. The passengers were told their arrival in Seattle would be delayed because of a "minor mechanical difficulty". Donald Nyrop, the president of Northwest Orient, authorized payment of the ransom and ordered all employees to cooperate with the hijacker and comply with his demands. For approximately two hours, Flight 305 circled Puget Sound to give Seattle police and the FBI sufficient time to assemble Cooper's ransom money and parachutes, and to mobilize emergency personnel.

During the flight from Portland to Seattle, Cooper demanded flight attendant Mucklow remain by his side at all times. Mucklow said Cooper appeared familiar with the local terrain; while looking out the window, Cooper remarked, "Looks like Tacoma down there", as the aircraft flew above it. Cooper also correctly noted McChord Air Force Base was only a 20-minute drive from Sea-Tac Airport. Mucklow later described the hijacker's demeanor: "[Cooper] was not nervous. He seemed rather nice and he was not cruel or nasty."

While the plane circled Seattle, Mucklow chatted with Cooper and asked why he picked Northwest Airlines to hijack. Cooper replied, "It's not because I have a grudge against your airlines, it's just because I have a grudge." Cooper then asked where Mucklow was from, and Mucklow said she was originally from Pennsylvania, but was living in Minneapolis at the time. Minnesota was very nice country, Cooper responded. Mucklow then asked Cooper where he was from, but he became upset and refused to answer. Cooper then asked Mucklow if she smoked and offered her a cigarette. Mucklow said she had quit, but accepted the cigarette from Cooper.

FBI records note Cooper briefly spoke to an unidentified passenger while the plane maintained its holding pattern over Seattle. In his interview with FBI agents, passenger George Labissoniere said he visited the restroom directly behind Cooper on several occasions. After one restroom visit, Labissoniere said the path to his seat was blocked by a passenger wearing a cowboy hat, questioning Mucklow about the alleged mechanical issue with the aircraft. Labissoniere said Cooper was initially amused by the interaction, then became irritated and told the man to return to his seat, but "the cowboy" ignored Cooper and continued to question Mucklow. Labissoniere claimed he eventually persuaded "the cowboy" to return to his seat.

Mucklow's version of the interaction differed from Labissoniere's. Mucklow said a passenger approached her, and asked for a sports magazine to read because he was bored. Mucklow and the passenger moved to an area directly behind Cooper, where the passenger and she looked for magazines. The passenger took a copy of The New Yorker and returned to his seat. When Mucklow returned to sit with Cooper, he said, "If that is a sky marshal, I don't want any more of that." Despite his brief interaction with Cooper, "the cowboy" was not interviewed by the FBI and was never identified.

FBI agents used several banks in the Seattle area to assemble the ransom. The money—10,000 unmarked $20 bills, most of which had serial numbers beginning with "L" (indicating issuance by the Federal Reserve Bank of San Francisco)—was photographed on microfilm by the FBI. Cooper rejected the military-issue parachutes offered by McChord AFB personnel, and demanded four civilian parachutes with manually operated ripcords. Seattle police obtained the two front (reserve) parachutes from a local skydiving school and the two back (main) parachutes from a local stunt pilot.

Passengers released

Around 5:24 PST, Captain Scott was informed the parachutes had been delivered to the airport, and notified Cooper they would soon be landing. At 5:46 PST, Flight 305 landed at Seattle-Tacoma Airport. Scott asked Cooper's permission—and Cooper agreed—to park the aircraft on a partially-lit runway, away from the main terminal. Cooper demanded only one representative of the airline could approach the plane with the parachutes and money, and the only entrance and exit would be through the aircraft's front door via the mobile air stairs. Northwest Orient's Seattle operations manager, Al Lee, was designated to be the courier who would approach the aircraft with the items Cooper requested. To avoid the possibility that Cooper might mistake Lee's airline uniform for that of a law enforcement officer, he changed into civilian clothes for the task. With the passengers remaining seated, a ground crew attached the mobile staircase. Per Cooper's directive, Mucklow exited the aircraft through the front door, and retrieved the ransom money. When Mucklow returned, she carried the money bag past the seated passengers to Cooper, seated in the last row. 

Cooper then agreed to release the passengers. As the passengers debarked, Cooper inspected the money. In an attempt to break the tension, Mucklow jokingly asked Cooper if she could have some of the money. Cooper readily agreed, handed Mucklow a packet of bills, but she immediately returned the money and explained accepting gratuities was against company policy. Mucklow said Cooper had tried to tip her and the other two flight attendants earlier in the flight with money from his own pocket, but they, too, had declined, citing the company policy.

With the passengers safely debarked, only Cooper and the six crew members remained aboard Flight 305. In accordance with Cooper's demands, Mucklow made three trips outside the aircraft to retrieve the parachutes, and brought them to Cooper in the rear of the plane. While Mucklow brought aboard the parachutes, Schaffner asked Cooper if she could retrieve her purse, stored in a compartment behind his seat. Cooper agreed and told Schaffner, "I won't bite you." Flight attendant Alice Hancock then asked Cooper if the flight attendants could leave, to which Cooper replied, "Whatever you girls would like," so Hancock and Schaffner debarked. When Mucklow brought the final parachute to Cooper, she gave him printed instructions for using the parachutes, but Cooper said he didn't need them.

A problem with the refueling process caused a delay, so a second truck and then a third were brought to the aircraft to complete the refueling. During the delay, Mucklow said Cooper complained the money was delivered in a cloth bag instead of a knapsack as he had directed, and he now had to improvise a new way to transport the money. Using a pocketknife, Cooper cut the canopy from one of the reserve parachutes, and stuffed some of the money into the empty parachute bag.

An FAA official requested a face-to-face meeting with Cooper aboard the aircraft, but Cooper denied the request. Cooper became impatient, saying, "This shouldn't take so long", and, "Let's get this show on the road." Cooper then gave the cockpit crew his flight plan and directives: a southeast course toward Mexico City at the minimum airspeed possible without stalling the aircraft—approximately —at a maximum  altitude. Cooper also specified the landing gear must remain deployed, the wing flaps must be lowered 15 degrees, and the cabin must remain unpressurized.

Cooper and the crew discussed options, and agreed on Reno–Tahoe International Airport as the refueling stop. Cooper further directed the aircraft take off with the rear exit door open and its airstair extended. Northwest's home office objected; leaving the aft staircase deployed during takeoff was unsafe. Cooper countered the procedure was safe, saying, "It can be done, do it," but Cooper did not argue the point and said he would lower the staircase once they were airborne. Cooper demanded Mucklow remain aboard to assist the operation.

Back in the air

Around 7:40 pm, Flight 305 took off, with only Cooper, Mucklow, Captain Scott, First Officer Rataczak, and Flight Engineer Harold E. Anderson aboard the aircraft. Two F-106 fighters from McChord Air Force Base and a Lockheed T-33 trainer—diverted from an unrelated Air National Guard mission—followed the 727. All three jets maintained "S" flight patterns to stay behind the slow-moving 727 and out of Cooper's view.

After takeoff, Cooper told Mucklow to lower the aft staircase. Mucklow told Cooper and the flight crew she feared being sucked out of the aircraft. The flight crew suggested Mucklow come to the cockpit and retrieve an emergency rope with which she could tie herself to a seat. Cooper rejected the suggestion, stating he did not want Mucklow going up front or the flight crew coming back to the cabin. Mucklow continued to express her fear to Cooper, and asked him to cut some cord from one of the parachutes to create a safety line for her. Cooper then told Mucklow he would lower the stairs himself, instructed Mucklow to go to the cockpit, to close the curtain partition (separating the Coach and First Class sections), and not to return.

Before she left, Mucklow begged Cooper, "Please, please take the bomb with you." Cooper responded he would either disarm the bomb or take it with him. As Mucklow walked to the cockpit and turned to close the curtain partition, she saw Cooper standing in the aisle tying what appeared to be the money bag around his waist. From the moment of takeoff to when Mucklow entered the cockpit, only four to five minutes had elapsed. For the rest of the flight to Reno, Mucklow remained in the cockpit. Mucklow was the last person to see the hijacker.

Around 8:00 pm, a cockpit warning light flashed, indicating the aft staircase had been activated. The pilot used the cabin intercom to ask Cooper if he needed assistance, but Cooper's last message was a one-word reply: "No." Suddenly, the crew's ears popped; the cabin air pressure had dropped because the aft door was open. At approximately 8:13 p.m., the aircraft's tail section suddenly pitched upward, forcing the pilots to trim and return the aircraft to level flight. In his interview with the FBI, Co-pilot Bill Rataczak said the sudden upward pitch occurred while the flight was near the suburbs north of Portland.

With the aft cabin door open and the staircase deployed, the flight crew remained in the cockpit, but were now unsure if Cooper were still aboard. Mucklow used the cabin intercom to inform Cooper they were approaching Reno, and he needed to raise the stairs so the plane could land safely. Mucklow repeated her requests as the pilots made the final approach to land, but neither Mucklow nor the flight crew received a reply from the hijacker.

At 11:02 pm, with the aft staircase still deployed, Flight 305 landed at Reno–Tahoe International Airport. FBI agents, state troopers, sheriff's deputies, and Reno police established a perimeter around the aircraft, but fearing the hijacker and the bomb were still aboard, did not approach the plane. Captain Scott searched the cabin, confirmed Cooper was no longer aboard, and after a 30-minute search, an FBI bomb squad declared the cabin safe.

Investigation
In addition to 66 latent fingerprints aboard the airliner, FBI agents recovered Cooper's black clip-on tie, tie clip, and two of the four parachutes, one of which had been opened and had two shroud lines cut from the canopy. FBI agents interviewed eyewitnesses in Portland, Seattle, and Reno, and developed a series of composite sketches.

Local police and FBI agents immediately began questioning possible suspects. Acting on the possibility the hijacker may have used his real name (or the same alias in a previous crime), Portland police discovered and interviewed a Portland citizen named D. B. Cooper. The Portland Cooper had a minor police record, but was quickly eliminated as a suspect. In his rush to meet a deadline, reporter James Long confused the Portland Cooper with the pseudonym used by the hijacker. United Press International wire service reporter Clyde Jabin republished Long’s error, and as other media sources repeated the name, "D. B. Cooper" became the hijacker's pseudonym.

Due to the number of variables and parameters, precisely defining the area to search was difficult. The jet’s airspeed estimates varied, and the environmental conditions along the flight path varied with the aircraft's location and altitude, and only Cooper knew how long he stayed in free-fall before pulling his ripcord. The Air Force F-106 pilots neither saw anyone jumping from the airliner, nor did their radar detect a deployed parachute. Moreover, a black-clad individual jumping into the moonless night would be difficult to see, especially given the limited visibility, cloud cover, and lack of ground lighting. The T-33 pilots did not make visual contact with the 727.

On December 6, 1971, FBI Director J. Edgar Hoover approved the use of an Air Force SR-71 Blackbird to retrace and photograph Flight 305's flightpath, and to locate the items Cooper carried during his jump. The SR-71 made five flights to retrace Flight 305's route, but due to poor visibility, the photography attempts were unsuccessful.

In an experimental recreation, flying the same aircraft used in the hijacking in the same flight configuration, FBI agents pushed a  sled out of the open airstair and were able to reproduce the upward motion of the tail section and brief change in cabin pressure described by the flight crew at 8:13 pm. Initial extrapolations placed Cooper's landing zone within an area on the southernmost outreach of Mount St. Helens, a few miles southeast of Ariel, Washington, near Lake Merwin, an artificial lake formed by a dam on the Lewis River. Search efforts focused on Clark and Cowlitz counties, encompassing the terrain immediately south and north, respectively, of the Lewis River in southwest Washington. FBI agents and sheriff's deputies searched large areas of the heavily wooded terrain on foot and by helicopter. Door-to-door searches of local farmhouses were also carried out. Other search parties ran patrol boats along Lake Merwin and Yale Lake, the reservoir immediately to its east. Neither Cooper nor any of the equipment he presumably carried was found.

Using fixed-wing aircraft and helicopters from the Oregon Army National Guard, the FBI coordinated an aerial search along the entire flight path (known as Victor 23 in U.S. aviation terminology but "Vector 23" in most Cooper  from Seattle to Reno. Although numerous broken treetops and several pieces of plastic and other objects resembling parachute canopies were sighted and investigated, nothing relevant to the hijacking was found.

Shortly after the spring thaw in early 1972, teams of FBI agents aided by some 200 soldiers from Fort Lewis, along with United States Air Force personnel, National Guardsmen, and civilian volunteers, conducted another thorough ground search of Clark and Cowlitz Counties for 18 days in March, and then another 18 days in April. Electronic Explorations Company, a marine-salvage firm, used a submarine to search the  depths of Lake Merwin. Two local women stumbled upon a skeleton in an abandoned structure in Clark County; it was later identified as the remains of Barbara Ann Derry, a teenaged girl who had been abducted and murdered several weeks before. Ultimately, the extensive search and recovery operation uncovered no significant material evidence related to the hijacking.

Based on early computer projections produced for the FBI, Cooper's drop zone was first estimated to be between Aerial Dam to the north and the town of Battle Ground, Washington, to the south. In March 1972, the FBI concluded their original calculations were incorrect after a joint investigation with Northwest Orient Airlines and the Air Force determined Cooper probably jumped over the town of La Center, Washington.

In 2019, the FBI released a report indicating that about three hours after Cooper jumped, a burglary was reported at a small grocery store near Heisson, Washington, an unincorporated community located within the calculated drop zone that Northwest Airlines presented to the FBI. The burglar was noted by the FBI to have taken only survival items such as beef jerky and gloves.

Search for ransom money
A month after the hijacking, the FBI distributed lists of the ransom serial numbers to financial institutions, casinos, racetracks, and other businesses that routinely conducted large cash transactions, and to law-enforcement agencies around the world. Northwest Orient offered a reward of 15% of the recovered money, to a maximum of $25,000. In early 1972, U.S. Attorney General John N. Mitchell released the serial numbers to the general public. Two men used counterfeit $20 bills printed with Cooper serial numbers to swindle $30,000 from a Newsweek reporter named Karl Fleming in exchange for an interview with a man they falsely claimed was the hijacker.

In early 1973, with the ransom money still missing, The Oregon Journal republished the serial numbers and offered $1,000 to the first person to turn in a ransom bill to the newspaper or any FBI field office. In Seattle, the Post-Intelligencer made a similar offer with a $5,000 reward. The offers remained in effect until Thanksgiving 1974, and though several near matches were reported, no genuine bills were found. In 1975, Northwest Orient's insurer, Global Indemnity Co., complied with an order from the Minnesota Supreme Court and paid the airline's $180,000 claim on the ransom money.

Later developments
Later analysis indicated that the original landing zone estimate was inaccurate; Captain Scott, who was flying the aircraft manually because of Cooper's speed and altitude demands, later determined his flight path was farther east than initially assumed. Additional data from a variety of sources—in particular Continental Airlines pilot Tom Bohan, who was flying four minutes behind Flight 305—indicated the wind direction factored into drop-zone calculations had been wrong, possibly by as much as 80°. This and other supplemental data suggested the actual drop zone was south-southeast of the original estimate, in the drainage area of the Washougal River.

FBI Agent Ralph Himmelsbach wrote, "I have to confess, if I were going to look for Cooper... I would head for the Washougal." The Washougal Valley and its surroundings have been searched repeatedly in subsequent years; to date, no discoveries traceable to the hijacking have been reported. Some investigators have speculated that the 1980 eruption of Mount St. Helens could have obliterated any remaining physical clues.

Investigation suspended
On July 8, 2016, the FBI announced active investigation of the Cooper case was suspended, citing the need to focus investigative resources and manpower on issues of higher and more urgent priority. Local field offices would continue to accept any legitimate physical evidence, related specifically to the parachutes or to the ransom money, that may emerge in the future. The 66-volume case file compiled over the 45-year course of the investigation will be preserved for historical purposes at FBI headquarters in Washington, DC, and on the FBI website. All of the evidence is open to the public. The crime remains the only unsolved case of air piracy in commercial aviation history.

Physical evidence
During their forensic search of the aircraft, FBI agents found four major pieces of evidence, each with a direct physical link to Cooper: a black clip-on tie, a mother-of-pearl tie clip, a hair from Cooper’s headrest, and eight filter-tipped Raleigh cigarette butts from the armrest ashtray.

Clip-on necktie
FBI agents found a black clip-on necktie in seat 18-E, where Cooper had been seated. Attached to the tie was a gold tie-clip with a circular mother-of-pearl setting in the center of the clip. The FBI determined the tie had been sold exclusively at JCPenney department stores, but was discontinued in 1968.

By late 2007, the FBI had built a partial DNA profile from samples found on Cooper's tie in 2001. However, the FBI also acknowledged no evidence linked Cooper to the source of the DNA sample. Said FBI Special Agent Fred Gutt, "The tie had two small DNA samples, and one large sample . . . it's difficult to draw firm conclusions from these samples." The FBI also made public a file of previously unreleased evidence, including Cooper's plane ticket, composite sketches, fact sheets, and posted a request for information about Cooper's identification.

In March 2009, a group of "citizen sleuths” using GPS, satellite imagery, and other technologies unavailable in 1971, began reinvestigating components of the case. Known as the Cooper Research Team (CRT), the group included paleontologist Tom Kaye from the Burke Museum of Natural History and Culture in Seattle, scientific illustrator Carol Abraczinskas, and metallurgist Alan Stone. Although the CRT obtained little new information about the buried ransom money or Cooper's landing zone, they found, analyzed, and identified hundreds of organic and metallic particles on Cooper's tie.

Using electron microscopy, the CRT identified Lycopodium spores, the source of which was likely pharmaceutical. The team also found minute particles of unalloyed titanium on the tie, along with particles of bismuth, antimony, cerium, strontium sulfide, aluminum, and titanium-antimony alloys. The metal and rare-earth particles suggested Cooper may have worked for Boeing or another aeronautical engineering firm, at a chemical manufacturing plant, or at a metal fabrication and production facility.

The material with the most significance, explained Kaye, was the unalloyed titanium. In the 1970s, the use of pure titanium was rare and would only be used in aircraft fabrication facilities, or at chemical companies combining titanium and aluminum to store extremely corrosive substances. The cerium and strontium sulfide were used by Boeing's supersonic transport development project, and by Portland factories in which cathode ray tubes were manufactured, such as Teledyne and Tektronix. Cooper researcher Eric Ulis has speculated the titanium-antimony alloys are linked to Rem-Cru Titanium Inc., a metals manufacturer and Boeing contractor.

Hair samples

FBI agents found two hair samples in Cooper's seat - a single strand of limb hair on the seat, and a single strand of brown Caucasian head hair on the headrest. The limb hair was destroyed after the FBI Crime Laboratory determined the sample lacked enough unique microscopic characteristics to be useful. However, the FBI Crime Laboratory determined the head hair was suitable for future comparison, and preserved the hair on a microscope slide. During their attempts to build Cooper's DNA profile in 2002, the FBI discovered the hair sample had been lost.

Cigarette butts

In the armrest ashtray of seat 18-E, FBI agents found eight Raleigh filter-tipped cigarette butts. These were sent to the FBI Crime Laboratory to search for fingerprints, but investigators were unable to find fingerprints and returned the butts to the Las Vegas field office. In 1998, the FBI sought to extract DNA from the cigarette butts, but discovered the butts had been destroyed while in the custody of the Las Vegas field office.

Recovered ransom money

He uncovered three packets of the ransom cash totaling around $5,800 as he raked the sandy riverbank to build a campfire. The bills had disintegrated from lengthy exposure to the elements, but were still bundled in rubber bands. FBI technicians confirmed that the money was indeed a portion of the ransom: two packets of 100 twenty-dollar bills each, and a third packet of 90, all arranged in the same order as when given to Cooper.

The discovery launched several new rounds of conjecture and ultimately raised more questions than it answered. Initial statements by investigators and scientific consultants were founded on the assumption the bundled bills washed freely into the Columbia River from one of its many connecting tributaries. An Army Corps of Engineers hydrologist noted the bills had disintegrated in a "rounded" fashion and were "matted together", indicating they "had been deposited by river action", as opposed to having been deliberately buried. That conclusion, if correct, supported the opinion that Cooper had not landed near Lake Merwin nor any tributary of the Lewis River, which feeds into the Columbia well downstream from Tina Bar. It also lent credence to supplemental speculation the drop zone was near the Washougal River, which merges with the Columbia upstream from the discovery site.

The "free-floating" hypothesis presented difficulties; it did not explain the 10 bills missing from one packet, nor was there a logical reason the three packets would have remained together after separating from the rest of the money. Physical evidence was incompatible with geological evidence; Himmelsbach wrote free-floating bundles would have washed up on the bank "within a couple of years" of the hijacking; otherwise, the rubber bands would have long since deteriorated. Geological evidence suggested the bills arrived at Tina Bar after 1974, the year of a Corps of Engineers dredging operation on that stretch of the river. Geologist Leonard Palmer of Portland State University found two distinct layers of sand and sediment between the clay deposited on the riverbank by the dredge and the sand layer in which the bills were buried, indicating that the bills arrived long after dredging had been completed.

In late 2020, analysis of diatoms found on the bills suggests the bundles found at Tina Bar were not submerged in the river or buried dry at the time of the hijacking in November 1971. Only diatoms that bloom during springtime were found, placing the date range that the money entered the water at least several months after the hijacking.

In 1986, after protracted negotiations, the recovered bills were divided equally between Ingram and Northwest Orient's insurer Royal Globe Insurance; the FBI retained 14 examples as evidence. Ingram sold fifteen of his bills at auction in 2008 for about $37,000.

The Columbia River ransom money remains the only confirmed physical evidence from the hijacking found outside the aircraft.

Parachutes
During the hijacking, Cooper demanded and received two main chutes and two reserve chutes. The two reserve (front) chutes came from a local skydiving school and the two main (back) chutes were supplied by a local pilot, Norman Hayden. Earl Cossey, the parachute rigger who packed all four parachutes brought to Cooper, described the two main chutes as emergency bailout chutes as opposed to sporting parachutes that skydivers would use. Cossey further described the main chutes as being like military chutes because they were rigged to open immediately upon the ripcord being pulled and were incapable of being steered. When the plane landed in Reno, FBI agents discovered two parachutes that Cooper left behind: one reserve (front) chute and one main (back) chute. The reserve chute had been opened and three shroud lines had been cut out, but the main chute left behind was still intact. The unused main chute was described by FBI agents as a Model NB6 (Navy Backpack 6) and is on display at the Washington State Historical Society Museum.

One of the two reserve (front) chutes that Cooper was given was an unusable training chute intended to only be used for classroom demonstrations. According to Cossey, the reserve chute had a canopy inside of it that was sewn together so that skydiving students could get the feel of pulling a ripcord on a packed parachute without the canopy actually deploying. This nonfunctional reserve parachute was not found in the aircraft when it landed in Reno, leading FBI agents to speculate that Cooper was not an experienced parachutist because someone with experience would have realized this reserve chute was a "dummy chute". However, within days of the hijacking, it was revealed that neither of the parachute harnesses Cooper was given had the necessary D-rings required to attach reserve parachutes. Although Cooper lacked the ability to attach this "dummy" chute to his main harness as a reserve parachute, it was not found in the plane, so what he did with it is unknown. Cossey speculated that Cooper removed the sewn-together canopy and used the empty reserve container as an extra money bag. Tina Mucklow provided testimony that was in line with Cossey's speculation, stating that she recalled Cooper attempting to pack money inside a parachute container.

In November 1978, a deer hunter found a 727's instruction placard for lowering the aft airstair.

Theories, hypotheses and conjecture
Over the 45-year span of its active investigation, the FBI periodically made public some of its working hypotheses and tentative conclusions, drawn from witness testimony and the scarce physical evidence.

Sketches
During the first year of the investigation, the FBI used eyewitness testimony from the passengers and flight crew to develop sketches of Cooper. The first sketch, officially titled Composite A, was completed a few days after the hijacking and was released on November 28, 1971. According to witnesses, the Composite A sketch—jokingly known as "Bing Crosby"—was not an accurate likeness of Cooper. The Composite A sketch, said witnesses, showed a young man with a narrow face, and did not resemble Cooper or capture his disinterested, “Let's get this over with" look. Flight attendant Florence Schaffner repeatedly told the FBI the Composite A sketch was a very poor likeness of Cooper.

After multiple eyewitnesses said Composite A was not an accurate rendering of Cooper, FBI artists developed a second composite sketch. Completed in late 1972, the second Composite B sketch was intended to more accurately depict Cooper's age, skin tone, and face shape. Eyewitnesses to whom Composite B was shown said the sketch was more accurate, but the Composite B Cooper looked too "angry" or "nasty." One flight attendant said the Composite B sketch looked like a "hoodlum," and remembered Cooper as, “...more refined in appearance." Moreover, said witnesses, the Composite B sketch depicted a man older than Cooper, with a lighter complexion. 

Using the criticisms of Composite B, FBI artists made adjustments and improvements to the Composite B sketch. On January 2, 1973, the FBI finalized revised Composite B, their third sketch of Cooper. Of the new sketch, one flight attendant said revised Composite B was, "a very close resemblance" to the hijacker. Opined another flight attendant, "the hijacker would be easily recognized from this sketch." 

In April 1973, the FBI concluded the revised Composite B sketch was the best likeness of Cooper they could develop, and should be considered the definitive sketch of Cooper.

Suspect profiling
The only person to recall his eye color was Schaffner, who described them as being brown. Gregory stated that he believed Cooper to be of Mexican-American or American Indian descent.

Cooper appeared to be familiar with the Seattle area and may have been an Air Force veteran, based on testimony that he recognized the city of Tacoma from the air as the jet circled Puget Sound, and his accurate comment to Mucklow that McChord Air Force Base was about 20-minutes' driving time from Seattle-Tacoma Airport—a detail most civilians would not know or comment upon. His financial situation was very likely desperate. According to the FBI's retired chief investigator, Ralph Himmelsbach, extortionists and other criminals who steal large amounts of money nearly always do so because they need it urgently; otherwise, the crime is not worth the considerable risk. Alternatively, Cooper may have been "a thrill seeker" who made the jump "just to prove it could be done".

In May 1973, the FBI internally released an eight-page suspect profile. The profile speculated that Cooper was a military-trained parachutist and not a sports skydiver, because, in addition to his apparent comfort level with the military-style parachutes he was provided, his age would have made him an outlier in the sport-skydiving community thereby increasing the likelihood that he would have been quickly recognized by a member of that community. The profile also speculated that Cooper was someone who exercised regularly due to comments by multiple eyewitnesses regarding Cooper's athletic-looking frame despite his age. They also felt he was not a heavy drinker or an alcoholic because the only drink he was served was quickly spilled and he never requested another. The profile determined that an alcoholic would have likely been incapable of turning down further alcoholic beverages throughout the stressful and lengthy hijacking. By calculating the number of cigarettes he smoked throughout the hijacking, the FBI believed that he smoked around one pack of cigarettes a day. Several of Cooper's mannerisms led the FBI to conclude that he was more intelligent than a common criminal such as his vocabulary level, his proper use of aviation-related terminology, complete lack of profane language, his calm demeanor, his style of dress, and the respect he showed for the female members of the crew. Cooper's ability to quickly and competently adapt to various situations as they arose indicated to profilers that he was likely the type of person who would commit a crime without the need or desire for an accomplice.

Agents theorized that Cooper took his alias from a popular French-language Belgian comics series featuring the fictional hero Dan Cooper, a Royal Canadian Air Force test pilot who took part in numerous heroic adventures, including parachuting. (One cover from the series, reproduced on the FBI website, depicts test pilot Cooper skydiving.) Because the Dan Cooper comics were never translated into English, nor imported to the U.S., they speculated that he had encountered them during a tour of duty in Europe.

Knowledge and planning 
Based on the evidence and Cooper’s tactics, the FBI speculated Cooper carefully planned the hijacking and had detailed, specific knowledge of aviation, the local terrain, and the 727’s capabilities.

Cooper chose a seat in the last row of the rear cabin for three reasons - to observe and respond to any action in front of him, to minimize the possibility of being approached or attacked by someone behind him, and to make himself less conspicuous to the rest of the passengers. To ensure he would not be deliberately supplied with sabotaged equipment, Cooper demanded four parachutes to force the assumption he might compel one or more hostages to jump with him. FBI agent Ralph Himmelsbach noted Cooper’s choice of a bomb—instead of other weapons previously used by hijackers—thwarted any multidirectional attempts by the FBI to rush him.

Cooper was also careful to avoid leaving evidence. Before he jumped, Cooper demanded Mucklow return to him all notes either written by him, or on his behalf. Mucklow said she used the last match in Cooper’s paper matchbook to light one of his cigarettes, and when she attempted to dispose of the empty matchbook, Cooper demanded she return it to him. Although Cooper was methodical in his attempts to retrieve evidence, he was unsuccessful; he left his clip-on tie in his seat.

Although Cooper was clearly familiar with the 727's capabilities and confidential features, its design was the primary reason Cooper chose the aircraft. With its aft airstair and the placement of its three engines, the 727 was the only passenger jet from which a parachute jump could be easily made. Cooper also knew the 727 had "single-point fueling", a new feature with which all the fuel tanks could be rapidly filled through a single fuel port, and was familiar with the 727's typical refueling time.

By specifying a 15°  flap setting, Cooper displayed specific knowledge of aviation tactics and the 727's capabilities; unlike most commercial jet airliners, the 727 could remain in slow, low-altitude flight without stalling. Cooper's specific flap setting also allowed him to control the 727’s airspeed and altitude without entering the cockpit, where Cooper could have been overpowered by the three pilots. First Officer Bill Rataczak, who spoke with Cooper on the intercom during the hijacking, told the FBI, "[Cooper] displayed a specific knowledge of flying and aircraft in general."

The most significant knowledge Cooper displayed was a feature both secret and unique to the 727; the aft airstair could be operated during flight, and the single activation switch in the rear of the cabin could not be overridden from the cockpit. Cooper knew how to operate the aft staircase, and had clearly planned to use it for his escape. The FBI speculated Cooper knew the Central Intelligence Agency was using 727s to drop agents and supplies into enemy territory during the Vietnam War. Since no situation on a passenger flight would necessitate such an operation, civilian crews were neither informed the aft airstair could be lowered midflight, nor were they aware its operation could not be overridden from the cockpit.

Cooper appeared to be familiar with parachutes, although his experience level is unknown. Mucklow said Cooper, "...appeared to be completely familiar with the parachutes which had been furnished to him," and told a journalist, "Cooper put on [his] parachute as though he did so every day," Cooper's familiarity with the military-style parachutes he was given has led to speculation that Cooper was a military parachutist and not a civilian skydiver.

Larry Carr—who led the investigative team from 2006 to 2009—does not believe Cooper was a paratrooper. Instead, Carr speculates Cooper had been an Air Force aircraft cargo loader. An aircraft cargo-loading assignment would provide Cooper with aviation knowledge and experience: cargo loaders have basic jump training, wear emergency parachutes, and know how to dispatch items from planes in flight. As a cargo loader, Cooper would be familiar with parachutes, "...but not necessarily sufficient knowledge to survive the jump he made."

Fate 
From the beginning of their investigation, the FBI was skeptical about Cooper's chances and speculated Cooper did not survive his jump. The FBI provided several reasons and facts to support their conclusion - Cooper's apparent lack of skydiving experience, his apparent unfamiliarity with parachutes, his lack of proper equipment for his jump and survival, the inclement weather on the night of the hijacking, the wooded terrain into which Cooper jumped, Cooper's lack of knowledge of his landing area, and the unused ransom money.

First, Cooper appeared to lack the necessary skydiving knowledge, skills, and experience for the type of jump he attempted. "We originally thought Cooper was an experienced jumper, perhaps even a paratrooper," said Carr. "We concluded after a few years this was simply not true. No experienced parachutist would have jumped in the pitch-black night, in the rain, with a  wind in his face wearing loafers and a trench coat. It was simply too risky." Skydiving instructor Earl Cossey, who supplied the parachutes Cooper demanded, testified Cooper did not need extensive experience to survive the jump and "... anyone who had six or seven practice jumps could accomplish this." However, Cossey also noted jumping at night drastically increased the risk of injury, and without jump boots, Cooper would have probably suffered severe ankle or leg injuries upon landing.

Second, Cooper did not appear to have the equipment necessary for either his jump or his survival in the wilderness. Cooper failed to bring or request a helmet, and jumped into a 15 °F (−9 °C) wind at 10,000 feet (3,000 m) in November over Washington State without proper protection against the extreme wind chill. Although the contents of Cooper's  paper bag are unknown, Cooper did not use any of the bag's contents to assist him during any part of the hijacking, so the FBI speculated the bag contained items Cooper needed for his jump, such as boots, gloves, and goggles.

Third, Cooper did not appear to have an accomplice waiting on the ground to help him escape. Such an arrangement would have required both a precisely timed jump and the flight crew's cooperation to follow a predetermined flight path, but Cooper did not give the flight crew a specific path. Moreover, the flight crew proposed—and Cooper agreed—to alter the flight path, and fly from Seattle to Reno for refueling, and Cooper had no way of keeping an accomplice apprised of his changed plans. The low cloud cover and lack of visibility to the ground further complicated Cooper's ability to determine his location, establish a bearing, or see his landing zone.

Finally, the ransom money was never spent, and the recovered portion was found unused. "Diving into the wilderness without a plan, without the right equipment, in such terrible conditions, he probably never even got his chute open," said Carr. FBI agent Richard Tosaw theorized Cooper became incapacitated from hypothermia during his jump, landed in the Columbia River, and drowned. However, FBI agents were not unanimous in their assessments of Cooper's ultimate fate. In a 1976 Seattle Times article, a senior FBI agent anonymously opined, "I think [Cooper] made it. I think he slept in his own bed that night. It was a clear night. A lot of the country is pretty flat . . . he could have just walked out. Right down the road. Hell, they weren't even looking for him there at the time. They thought he was somewhere else. He could just walk down the road."

Conclusive evidence of Cooper's death has not been found. In the months following the Cooper hijacking, five men attempted copycat hijackings, and all five survived their parachute escapes. The survival of the copycats – several of whom faced circumstances and conditions similar to Cooper's jump – forced FBI lead case agent Ralph Himmelsbach to reevaluate his opinions and theories regarding Cooper's chances for survival. Himmelsbach cited three examples of hijackers who survived jumps in conditions similar to Cooper's escape: Martin McNally, Frederick Hahneman, and Richard LaPoint.

Hijacker Martin McNally jumped using only a reserve chute, without protective gear, at night, over Indiana. Unlike Cooper, who appeared to be familiar with parachutes, McNally had to be shown how to put on his parachute. Additionally, McNally's pilot increased the airspeed to 320 knots, nearly twice the airspeed of Flight 305 at the time of Cooper's jump. The increased windspeed caused a violent jump for McNally: The money bag was immediately torn from McNally, "...yet he had landed unharmed except for some superficial scratches and bruises."

49-year-old Frederick Hahneman hijacked a 727 in Pennsylvania and survived after jumping at night into a Honduran jungle. A third copycat, Richard LaPoint, hijacked a 727 in Nevada. Wearing only trousers, a shirt, and cowboy boots, LaPoint jumped into the freezing January wind over northern Colorado, and landed in the snow. In 2008, Himmelsbach admitted he originally thought Cooper had only a fifty-percent chance of survival, but subsequently revised his assessment.

By 1976, most published legal analyses concurred the impending expiration of the statute of limitations for prosecution of the hijacker would make little difference: Since the statute's interpretation varies from case to case, and from court to court, a prosecutor could argue Cooper had forfeited legal immunity on any of several valid technical grounds. In November 1976, a Portland grand jury returned an indictment in absentia against "John Doe, a.k.a. Dan Cooper" for air piracy and violation of the Hobbs Act. The indictment formally initiated prosecution to be continued, should the hijacker be apprehended at any time in the future.

Suspects
Between 1971 and 2016, the FBI processed more than a thousand "serious suspects", including assorted publicity seekers and deathbed confessors.

Ted Braden 

Theodore Burdette Braden, Jr. (1928–2007) was a Special Forces commando during the Vietnam War, a master skydiver, and a convicted felon. He was believed by many within the Special Forces community, both at the time of the hijacking and in subsequent years, to have been Cooper. Born in Ohio, Braden first joined the military at the age of 16 in 1944, serving with the 101st Airborne during World War II. He eventually became one of the military's leading parachutists, often representing the Army in international skydiving tournaments, and his military records list him as having made 911 jumps. During the 1960s, Braden was a team leader within the MACVSOG, a classified commando unit of Green Berets which conducted unconventional warfare operations during the Vietnam War. He also served as a military skydiving instructor, teaching HALO jumping techniques to members of Project Delta. Braden spent 23 months in Vietnam, conducting classified operations within both North and South Vietnam, as well as Laos and Cambodia. In December 1966, Braden deserted his unit in Vietnam and made his way to the Congo to serve as a mercenary, but only served there a short time before being arrested by CIA agents and taken back to the United States for a court-martial. Despite having committed a capital offense by deserting in wartime, Braden was given an honorable discharge and barred from re-enlisting in the military in exchange for his continued secrecy about the MACVSOG program.

Braden was profiled in the October 1967 issue of Ramparts Magazine, wherein he was described by fellow Special Forces veteran and journalist Don Duncan as being someone with a "secret death wish" who "continually places himself in unnecessary danger but always seems to get away with it", specifically referring to Braden's disregard for military skydiving safety regulations. Duncan also claimed that during Braden's time in Vietnam, he was "continuously involved in shady deals to make money." Following his military discharge in 1967, the details of Braden's life are largely unknown, but at the time of the hijacking he was a truck driver for Consolidated Freightways, which was headquartered in Vancouver, Washington, just across the Columbia River from Portland and not far from the suspected dropzone of Ariel, Washington. It is also known that at some point in the early 1970s he was investigated by the FBI for stealing $250,000 during a trucking scam he had allegedly devised, but he was never charged for this supposed crime. In 1980, Braden was indicted by a Federal grand jury for driving an 18-wheeler full of stolen goods from Arizona to Massachusetts, but it is unknown whether there was a conviction in that case. Two years later Braden was arrested in Pennsylvania for driving a stolen vehicle with fictitious plates and for having no driver's license. Braden eventually ended up being sent to Federal prison at some point during the late 1980s, serving time in Pennsylvania, but the precise crime is unknown.

Despite his ability as a soldier, he was not well liked personally and was described by a family member as "the perfect combination of high intelligence and criminality". From his time working covert operations in Vietnam, he likely would have possessed the then-classified knowledge about the ability and proper specifications for jumping from a 727, perhaps having done it himself on MACVSOG missions. However, he possessed a dark complexion from years of outdoor military service, had short dark hair, a medium athletic build, and was 43 years of age at the time of the hijacking, which are features all in line with the descriptions of Cooper.

Kenneth Peter Christiansen 
In 2003, Minnesota resident Lyle Christiansen watched a television documentary about the Cooper hijacking and became convinced that his late brother Kenneth (1926–1994) was Cooper. After repeated futile attempts to convince first the FBI and then the author and film director Nora Ephron (who he hoped would make a movie about the case), he contacted a private investigator in New York City. In 2010, the detective, Skipp Porteous, published a book postulating that Christiansen was the hijacker. The following year, an episode of the History series Brad Meltzer's Decoded also summarized the circumstantial evidence linking Christiansen to the Cooper case.

Christiansen enlisted in the Army in 1944 and was trained as a paratrooper. World War II had ended by the time he was deployed in 1945, but he made occasional training jumps while stationed in Japan with occupation forces in the late 1940s. After leaving the Army, he joined Northwest Orient in 1954 as a mechanic in the South Pacific and subsequently became a flight attendant, and then a purser, based in Seattle. Christiansen was 45 years old at the time of the hijacking, but he was shorter (5 ft 8 in or 173 cm), thinner (150 pounds or 68 kg), and lighter in complexion than eyewitness descriptions of Cooper. Christiansen smoked (as did the hijacker) and displayed a fondness for bourbon (the drink Cooper had requested). Schaffner told a reporter that photos of Christiansen fit her memory of the hijacker's appearance more closely than those of other suspects she had been shown, but could not conclusively identify him.

Despite the publicity generated by Porteous's book and the 2011 television documentary, the FBI stands by its position that Christiansen cannot be considered a prime suspect. It cites the poor match to eyewitness physical descriptions and a complete absence of direct incriminating evidence.

Jack Coffelt
Bryant "Jack" Coffelt (1917–1975) was a con man, ex-convict, and purported government informant who claimed to have been the chauffeur and confidant of Abraham Lincoln's last undisputed descendant, great-grandson Robert Todd Lincoln Beckwith. In 1972, he began claiming he was Cooper and attempted through an intermediary, a former cellmate named James Brown, to sell his story to a Hollywood production company. Photos of Coffelt bear a resemblance to the composite drawings, although he was in his mid-fifties in 1971. He was reportedly in Portland on the day of the hijacking and sustained leg injuries around that time which were consistent with a skydiving mishap.

Coffelt's account was reviewed by the FBI, which concluded that it differed in several details from information that had not been made public and was therefore a fabrication. Brown, undeterred, continued peddling the story long after Coffelt died in 1975. Multiple media venues, including the CBS news program 60 Minutes, considered and rejected it.

Lynn Doyle Cooper
Lynn Doyle "L.D." Cooper (1931–1999), a leather worker and Korean War veteran, was proposed as a suspect in July 2011 by his niece, Marla Cooper. The next day Flight 305 was hijacked; and though the uncles ostensibly were turkey hunting, L.D. Cooper came home wearing a bloody shirt—the result, he said, of an auto accident. Later, Marla claimed, her parents came to believe that L.D. was the hijacker. She also recalled that her uncle, who died in 1999, was obsessed with the Canadian comic book hero Dan Cooper and "had one of his comic books thumbtacked to his wall"—although he was not a skydiver or paratrooper.

In August 2011, New York magazine published an alternative witness sketch, reportedly based on a description by Flight 305 eyewitness Robert Gregory, depicting horn-rimmed sunglasses, a "russet"-colored suit jacket with wide lapels, and marcelled hair. The article observed that L.D. Cooper had wavy hair that looked marcelled (as did Duane Weber). The FBI announced that no fingerprints had been found on a guitar strap made by L.D. Cooper. One week later, they added that his DNA did not match the partial DNA profile obtained from the hijacker's tie, but acknowledged that there is no certainty that the hijacker was the source of the organic material obtained from the tie.

Barbara Dayton
Barbara Dayton (1926–2002), a recreational pilot and University of Washington librarian who was born Robert Dayton, served in the U.S. Merchant Marine and then the Army during World War II. After discharge, Dayton worked with explosives in the construction field and aspired to a professional airline career, but could not obtain a commercial pilot's license.

Dayton underwent gender reassignment surgery in 1969, changed her name to Barbara, and is believed to be the first person to undergo this surgery in Washington State. She claimed to have staged the Cooper hijacking two years later, presenting as a man, in order to "get back" at the airline industry and the FAA, whose insurmountable rules and conditions had prevented her from becoming an airline pilot. Dayton said that the ransom money was hidden in a cistern near Woodburn, Oregon, a suburban area south of Portland, but eventually recanted the entire story, ostensibly after learning that hijacking charges could still be brought. She also did not match the physical description particularly closely.

William Gossett
William Pratt Gossett (1930–2003) was a Marine Corps, Army, and Army Air Forces veteran who had military service in Korea and Vietnam. His military experience included jump training and wilderness survival. Gossett was known to be obsessed with the Cooper hijacking. According to Galen Cook, a lawyer who has collected information related to Gossett for years, he once showed his sons a key to a Vancouver, British Columbia, safe deposit box which, he claimed, contained the long-missing ransom money.

The FBI has no direct evidence implicating Gossett and cannot even reliably place him in the Pacific Northwest at the time of the hijacking. "There is not one link to the D.B. Cooper case," said Special Agent Carr, "other than the statements [Gossett] made to someone."

Joe Lakich 
Joe Lakich (1921–2017) was a retired U.S. Army Major and Korean War veteran whose daughter was killed less than two months before the hijacking, as a consequence of a botched hostage negotiation conducted by the FBI. The events culminating in the death of Lakich's daughter, Susan Giffe, would be studied by hostage negotiators for decades as an example of what not to do during a hostage situation. Lakich and his wife later sued the FBI, and ultimately an Appeals Court ruled in their favor, holding that the FBI acted negligently during the hostage negotiation.

Lakich would become a Cooper suspect in large part due to the revelation that Cooper's tie contained microscopic particles of uncommon metals, such as pure titanium. It is speculated that few people during that era would have contact with such materials, and that Cooper may have worked in a manufacturing environment working on electronics as engineer or manager. When the hijacking occurred, Lakich was working in Nashville as a production supervisor at an electronics capacitor factory and would have likely been exposed to the materials found on the tie. When Cooper was asked by Tina Mucklow why he was committing the hijacking, he replied: "It's not because I have a grudge against your airlines, it's just because I have a grudge." It is believed by some that this "grudge" was Lakich's anger toward the FBI for their failed efforts at rescuing his daughter less than two months earlier.

John List

John Emil List (1925–2008) was an accountant and war veteran who murdered his wife, three teenage children, and 85-year-old mother in Westfield, New Jersey, fifteen days before the Cooper hijacking, withdrew $200,000 from his mother's bank account, and disappeared. He came to the attention of the Cooper task force due to the timing of his disappearance, multiple matches to the hijacker's description, and the reasoning that "a fugitive accused of mass murder has nothing to lose". After his capture in 1989, List denied any involvement in the Cooper hijacking: no substantial evidence implicates him, and the FBI no longer considers him a suspect. List died in prison in 2008.

Ted Mayfield
Theodore Ernest Mayfield (1935–2015) was a Special Forces veteran, pilot, competitive skydiver, and skydiving instructor. He served time in 1994 for negligent homicide after two of his students died when their parachutes failed to open and was later found indirectly responsible for thirteen additional skydiving deaths due to faulty equipment and training. In 2010, he was sentenced to three years' probation for piloting a plane 26 years after losing his pilot's license and rigging certificates. He was suggested repeatedly as a suspect early in the investigation, according to FBI Agent Ralph Himmelsbach, who knew Mayfield from a prior dispute at a local airport. He was ruled out, based partly on the fact that he called Himmelsbach less than two hours after Flight 305 landed in Reno to volunteer advice on standard skydiving practices and possible landing zones, as well as information on local skydivers.

Richard McCoy Jr.

Richard McCoy (1942–1974) was an Army veteran who served two tours of duty in Vietnam, first as a demolition expert and later with the Green Berets as a helicopter pilot. After his military service, he became a warrant officer in the Utah National Guard and an avid recreational skydiver, with aspirations of becoming a Utah State Trooper.

On April 7, 1972, McCoy staged the best-known of the so-called "copycat" hijackings (see below). After delivery of the money and parachutes at San Francisco International Airport, McCoy ordered the aircraft back into the sky and bailed out over Provo, Utah, leaving behind his handwritten hijacking instructions and his fingerprints on a magazine he had been reading.

He was arrested on April 9 with the ransom cash in his possession and, after trial and conviction, received a 45-year sentence. Two years later, he escaped from Lewisburg Federal Penitentiary with several accomplices by crashing a garbage truck through the main gate. Tracked down three months later in Virginia Beach, McCoy was killed in a shootout with FBI agents.

In their 1991 book, D.B. Cooper: The Real McCoy, parole officer Bernie Rhodes and former FBI agent Russell Calame asserted that they had identified McCoy as Cooper. They cited obvious similarities in the two hijackings, claims by McCoy's family that the tie and mother-of-pearl tie clip left on the plane belonged to McCoy, and McCoy's own refusal to admit or deny that he was Cooper. A proponent of their claim was the FBI agent who killed McCoy. "When I shot Richard McCoy," he said, "I shot D. B. Cooper at the same time."

Although there is no reasonable doubt that McCoy committed the Denver hijacking, the FBI does not consider him a suspect in the Cooper case because of mismatches in age and description, a level of skydiving skill well above that thought to be possessed by the hijacker, and credible evidence that McCoy was in Las Vegas on the day of the Portland hijacking, and at home in Utah the day after, having Thanksgiving dinner with his family.

Vincent C. Petersen
	
On November 11, 2022, Eric Ulis held a press conference putting forward Vincent C. Petersen as a person of interest.  While researching the spectrum analysis that was done on Cooper’s tie, Ulis discovered 3 particles that appeared to be a very rare titanium antimony alloy.  Petersen worked at a company named Rem-Cru, based in Midland, Pennsylvania, and later in metro Pittsburgh, that manufactured titanium-antimony alloys.

Sheridan Peterson

Sheridan Peterson (1926–2021) served in the Marine Corps during World War II and was later employed as a technical editor at Boeing, based in Seattle. Investigators took an interest in Peterson as a suspect soon after the skyjacking because of his experience as a smokejumper and love of taking physical risks, as well as his similar appearance and age (44) to the Cooper description.

Peterson often teased the media about whether he was really Cooper. Entrepreneur Eric Ulis, who spent years investigating the crime, said he was "98% convinced" that Peterson was Cooper; but when pressed by FBI agents, Peterson insisted he was in Nepal at the time of the hijacking. He died in 2021.

In an episode of History Channel's History's Greatest Mysteries (Season 1, Episode 1, first aired on November 14, 2020), analysis of DNA found on the tie worn by Cooper indicated that Peterson was not a match for Cooper when compared to a DNA sample from one of Peterson's living daughters.

Robert Rackstraw

Robert Wesley Rackstraw (1943–2019) was a retired pilot and ex-convict who served on an Army helicopter crew and other units during the Vietnam War. He came to the attention of the Cooper task force in February 1978, after he was arrested in Iran and deported to the U.S. to face explosives possession and check kiting charges. Several months later, while released on bail, Rackstraw attempted to fake his own death by radioing a false mayday call and telling controllers that he was bailing out of a rented plane over Monterey Bay. Police later arrested him in Fullerton, California, on an additional charge of forging federal pilot certificates; the plane he claimed to have ditched was found, repainted, in a nearby hangar. Cooper investigators noted his physical resemblance to Cooper composite sketches (although he was only 28 in 1971), military parachute training, and criminal record, but eliminated him as a suspect in 1979 after no direct evidence of his involvement could be found.

In 2016, Rackstraw re-emerged as a suspect in a History program and a book. On September 8, 2016, Thomas J. Colbert, the author of the book, and attorney Mark Zaid filed a lawsuit to compel the FBI to release its Cooper case file under the Freedom of Information Act.

In 2017, Colbert and a group of volunteer investigators uncovered what they believed to be "a decades-old parachute strap" at an undisclosed location in the Pacific Northwest. This was followed later in 2017 with a piece of foam, which they suspected was part of Cooper's parachute backpack. In January 2018, Tom and Dawna Colbert reported that they had obtained a "confession" letter originally written in December 1971 containing "codes" that matched three units Rackstraw was a part of while in the Army.

One of the Flight 305 flight attendants reportedly "did not find any similarities" between photos of Rackstraw from the 1970s and her recollection of Cooper's appearance. Rackstraw's attorney called the renewed allegations "the stupidest thing I've ever heard," and Rackstraw himself told People magazine, "It's a lot of [expletive], and they know it is." The FBI declined further comment. Rackstraw stated in a 2017 phone interview that he lost his job over the 2016 investigations. "I told everybody I was [the hijacker]," Rackstraw told Colbert, before explaining the admission was a stunt. He died in 2019.

Walter R. Reca 
Walter R. Reca (1933–2014) was a former military paratrooper and intelligence operative. He was proposed as a suspect by his friend Carl Laurin in 2018. In 2008, Reca told Laurin via a recorded phone call that he was the hijacker.

Reca gave Laurin permission in a notarized letter to share his story after his death. He also allowed Laurin to tape their phone conversations about the crime over a six-week period in late 2008. In over three hours of recordings, Reca shared details about his version of the hijacking. He also confessed to his niece, Lisa Story.

From Reca's description of the terrain on his way to the drop zone, Laurin concluded that he landed near Cle Elum, Washington. After Reca described an encounter with a dump truck driver at a roadside cafe after he landed, Laurin located Jeff Osiadacz, who was driving his dump truck near Cle Elum the night of the hijacking and met a stranger at the Teanaway Junction Café just outside of town. The man asked Osiadacz to give his friend directions to the café over the phone, presumably to be picked up, and he complied. Laurin convinced Joe Koenig, a former member of the Michigan State Police, of Reca's guilt. Koenig later published a book on Cooper, titled Getting the Truth: I Am D.B. Cooper.

These claims have aroused skepticism. Reca was a military paratrooper and private skydiver with hundreds of jumps to his credit, in contradiction to the FBI's publicized profile of an amateur skydiver at best. Reca also did not resemble the composite portrait the FBI assembled, which Laurin and Osiadacz used to explain why Osiadacz's suspicions were not aroused at the time. In response to the allegations against Reca, the FBI said that it would be inappropriate to comment on specific tips provided to them, and that no evidence to date had proved the culpability of any suspect beyond a reasonable doubt.

William J. Smith

In November 2018, The Oregonian published an article proposing William J. Smith (1928–2018), of Bloomfield, New Jersey, as a suspect. The article was based on research conducted by an Army data analyst who sent his findings to the FBI in mid-2018. Smith, a New Jersey native, was a World War II veteran. After high school, he enlisted in the United States Navy and volunteered for combat air crew training. After his discharge, he worked for the Lehigh Valley Railroad and was affected by the Penn Central Transportation Company's bankruptcy in 1970, the largest bankruptcy in U.S. history at that time. The article proposed that the loss of his pension created a grudge against the corporate establishment and transportation field, as well as a sudden need for money. Smith was 43 at the time of the hijacking. In his high school yearbook, a list of alumni killed in World War II lists an Ira Daniel Cooper, possibly the source for the hijacker's pseudonym. The analyst claimed that Smith's naval aviation experience would have given him knowledge of planes and parachutes, and his railroad experience would have helped him find railroad tracks and hop on a train to escape the area after landing.

According to the analyst, aluminum spiral chips found on the clip-on tie could have come from a locomotive maintenance facility. Smith's information about the Seattle area may have come from his close friend Dan Clair, who was stationed at Fort Lewis during the war. (The analyst noted that the man who claimed to be Cooper in Max Gunther's 1985 book identified himself as "Dan LeClair".) Smith and Clair worked together for Conrail at Newark's Oak Island Yard. Smith retired from that facility as a yardmaster. The article noted that a picture of Smith on the Lehigh Valley Railroad website showed a "remarkable resemblance" to Cooper FBI sketches. The FBI said that it would be inappropriate to comment on tips related to Smith.

Duane L. Weber
Duane L. Weber (1924–1995) was a World War II Army veteran who served time in at least six prisons from 1945 to 1968 for burglary and forgery. He was proposed as a suspect by his widow, Jo, based primarily on a deathbed confession: three days before he died in 1995, Weber told his wife, "I am Dan Cooper." The name meant nothing to her, she said; but months later, a friend told her of its significance in the hijacking. She went to her local library to research Cooper, found Max Gunther's book, and discovered notations in the margins in her husband's handwriting. Like the hijacker, Weber drank bourbon and chain-smoked. Other circumstantial evidence included a 1979 trip to Seattle and the Columbia River, where his wife remembered him throwing a trash bag just upstream of Tina Bar.

Himmelsbach said, "[Weber] does fit the physical description (and) does have the criminal background that I have always felt was associated with the case", but did not believe Weber was Cooper. The FBI eliminated Weber as an active suspect in July 1998 when his fingerprints did not match any of those processed in the hijacked plane, and no other direct evidence could be found to implicate him. Later, his DNA also failed to match the samples recovered from Cooper's tie.

Similar hijackings

Cooper was among the first to attempt air piracy for personal gain, but merely eleven days prior to Cooper's hijack, Canadian Paul Joseph Cini hijacked an Air Canada DC-8 over Montana, but was overpowered by the crew when he put down his shotgun to strap on his parachute. Encouraged by Cooper's apparent success, fifteen similar hijackings—all unsuccessful—were attempted in 1972. Some notable examples from that year:
 Richard Charles LaPoint, an Army veteran from Boston, boarded Hughes Airwest Flight 800 at McCarran International Airport in Las Vegas on January 20. Brandishing what he claimed was a bomb while the DC-9 was on the taxiway, he demanded $50,000, two parachutes, and a helmet. After releasing the 51 passengers and two flight attendants, he ordered the plane on an eastward trajectory toward Denver, then bailed out over the treeless plains of northeastern Colorado. Authorities, tracking the locator-equipped parachute and his footprints in the snow and mud, apprehended him a few hours later.
 Richard McCoy Jr., a former Army Green Beret, hijacked a United Airlines 727-100 on April 7 after it left Denver, diverted it to San Francisco, then bailed out over Utah with $500,000 in ransom money. He landed safely and was arrested two days later.
 Frederick Hahneman used a handgun to hijack an Eastern Air Lines 727 in Allentown, Pennsylvania, on May 7, demanded $303,000, and eventually parachuted into his native Honduras. A month later, with the FBI in pursuit and a $25,000 bounty on his head, he surrendered at the American embassy in Tegucigalpa. After being given a life sentence in September, 1972, he was paroled in 1984.
 Robb Heady, a 22-year-old former Army paratrooper hijacked United Airlines Flight 239 from Reno to San Francisco on June 2, 1972. Carrying his own parachute and using a .357 revolver, he demanded $200,000 in ransom money. He successfully jumped from the plane and was captured the next morning.
 Martin McNally, an unemployed service-station attendant, used a submachine gun on June 23 to commandeer an American Airlines 727 en route from St. Louis, Missouri, to Tulsa, Oklahoma, then diverted it eastward to Indiana and bailed out with $500,000 in ransom. McNally lost the ransom money as he exited the aircraft, but landed safely near Peru, Indiana, and was apprehended a few days later in a Detroit suburb. When interviewed in a 2020 podcast retrospective, McNally said he had been inspired by Cooper.
With the advent of universal luggage searches in 1973 (see Airport security), the general incidence of hijackings dropped dramatically. There were no further notable Cooper imitators until July 11, 1980, when Glenn K. Tripp seized Northwest Orient Flight 608 at Seattle-Tacoma Airport, demanding $600,000 ($100,000 by an independent account), two parachutes, and the assassination of his boss. A quick-thinking flight attendant drugged Tripp's alcoholic drink with Valium. After a ten-hour standoff, during which Tripp reduced his demands to three cheeseburgers and a ground vehicle in which to escape, he was apprehended. Tripp attempted to hijack the same Northwest flight on January 21, 1983, and this time demanded to be flown to Afghanistan. When the plane landed in Portland, he was shot and killed by FBI agents.

Aftermath

Airport security
Despite the initiation of the federal Sky Marshal Program the previous year, 31 hijackings were committed in U.S. airspace in 1972; 19 of them were for the specific purpose of extorting money. In 15 of the extortion cases, the hijackers also demanded parachutes. In early 1973, the FAA began requiring airlines to search all passengers and their bags. Amid multiple lawsuits charging that such searches violated Fourth Amendment protections against search and seizure, federal courts ruled that they were acceptable when applied universally and when limited to searches for weapons and explosives. Only two hijackings were attempted in 1973, both by psychiatric patients; one hijacker, Samuel Byck, intended to crash the airliner into the White House to kill President Nixon.

Aircraft modifications

Due to multiple "copycat" hijackings in 1972, the FAA required that the exterior of all  aircraft be fitted with a spring-loaded device, later dubbed the "Cooper vane", that prevents lowering of the aft airstair during flight. The device consists of a flat blade of aluminum mounted on a pivot. The pivot is at the center of the blade. The vane is fastened to the forward end of the blade forward of the pivot and extends away from the fuselage. The long edge of the vane is perpendicular to the blade. When the airplane is in flight, the force of air pushing against the vane exceeds the resistance of the spring and rotates the vane and blade about the pivot so that the vane becomes parallel with the airflow. This places the portion of the blade aft of the pivot over the edge of the airstair and physically blocks the airstair from opening. When the airplane is on the ground and the force of the spring is greater than the airflow against the vane, the spring rotates the vane perpendicular to the airflow and pivots the blade away from the edge of the airstair. This allows normal operation of the airstair on the ground. Operation of the vane is automatic and cannot be overridden from within the aircraft. As a direct result of the hijacking, the installation of peepholes was mandated in all cockpit doors; this enables the cockpit crew to observe passengers without opening the cockpit door.

Subsequent history of N467US

In 1978, the hijacked 727-100 aircraft was sold by Northwest Orient to Piedmont Airlines, where it was re-registered N838N and continued in domestic carrier service. In 1984, it was purchased by the charter company Key Airlines, re-registered N29KA, and incorporated into the Air Force's civilian charter fleet that shuttled workers between Nellis Air Force Base and the Tonopah Test Range during the F-117 Nighthawk development program. In 1996, the aircraft was scrapped for parts in a Memphis boneyard.

Death of Earl J. Cossey
On April 23, 2013, Earl J. Cossey, who packed the four parachutes that were given to Cooper, was found dead in his home in Woodinville, Washington, a suburb of Seattle. His death was ruled a homicide due to blunt-force trauma to the head. The perpetrator remains unknown. Some commenters alleged possible links to the Cooper case, but authorities responded that they had no reason to believe that any such link exists. Woodinville officials later announced that burglary was most likely the motive for the crime.

In popular culture

Himmelsbach famously called Cooper a "rotten sleazy crook," but his bold and unusual crime inspired a cult following that was expressed in song, film, and literature. Novelty shops sold t-shirts emblazoned with "D. B. Cooper, Where Are You?" Restaurants and bowling alleys in the Pacific Northwest hold regular Cooper-themed promotions and sell tourist souvenirs. A "Cooper Day" celebration has been held at the Ariel General Store and Tavern each November since 1974 with the exception of 2015, the year its owner, Dona Elliot, died.

Characters and situations inspired by Cooper have appeared in the story lines of the television series Prison Break, Justified, The Blacklist, NewsRadio, Leverage, Journeyman, Renegade, Numb3rs, 30 Rock, Drunk History, Breaking Bad, and Loki, as well as the 1981 film The Pursuit of D. B. Cooper, the 2004 film Without a Paddle, and a book titled The Vesuvius Prophecy, based on The 4400 TV series.

An annual convention, known as CooperCon, is held every year in late November in Vancouver, Washington. The event, founded by Cooper researcher Eric Ulis in 2018, is a multi-day gathering of Cooper researchers and enthusiasts. CooperCon took the place of the annual D.B. Cooper Days, which ended when the owner of the Ariel Store Pub died and the pub was forced to close.

See also

 Cold case
 Gentleman thief
 List of aircraft hijackings
 List of fugitives from justice who disappeared

Footnotes

References

Bibliography
 
 
 
 
  — Disclaimer: Large amounts of Gunther's content based on alleged interviews with a woman known as "Clara", who claimed to have discovered an injured Cooper two days after the hijacking and lived with him until he died a decade later. This material is considered by the FBI and others as a hoax or fabrication, whether by Gunther or "Clara". For critical analysis, see 
 
  (Himmelsbach was the FBI's chief investigator on the case until his retirement in 1980; "Norjak" is FBI shorthand for the Cooper hijacking.)
  (Straightforward accounting of official information and evidence.)

External links

 FBI Reading Room Files of the D.B. Cooper Case

1971 crimes in the United States
20th-century American criminals
Accidents and incidents involving the Boeing 727
Aviation accidents and incidents in the United States in 1971
Aviation in Nevada
Aviation in Oregon
Aviation in Washington (state)
Fugitives
Fugitives wanted by the United States
Hijackers
Missing air passengers
Northwest Airlines accidents and incidents
November 1971 events in the United States
Parachuting in the United States
Portland International Airport
Possibly living people
Reno–Tahoe International Airport
Seattle–Tacoma International Airport
Unidentified American criminals
Unsolved crimes in the United States
Year of birth unknown